Cerovlje is a village and a municipality in Istria, Croatia.

Description 
Many ancient towns and decayed castles (Belaj, Posert, Paz, Gologorica, Gradinje) can be found in its territory. Almost every town or castle in Cerovlje is on top of a hill, from where they could see enemies from a farther distance. During the Middle Ages (under the reign of the Holy Roman Empire), the people of Cerovlje also built many churches.

Demographics
The total population of Cerovlje is 1,667 (census 2011).

The census of 2011 had recorded the following settlements:
 Belaj, population 16
 Borut, population 213
 Cerovlje, population 241
 Ćusi, population 58
 Draguć, population 68
 Gologorica, population 269
 Gologorički Dol, population 80
 Gradinje, population 43
 Grimalda, population 75
 Korelići, population 53
 Novaki Pazinski, population 200
 Oslići, population 79
 Pagubice, population 127
 Paz, population 72
 Previž, population 83

Municipal population 

Note: Emerged from old Pazin municipality. From 1857 until 1971 includes part of the data of Pazin.

References

External links 

 

Municipalities of Croatia
Populated places in Istria County